Maam Cross is a crossroads in Connemara, County Galway, Ireland. It lies within the townland of Shindilla, at the junction of the N59 from Galway to Clifden and the R336 from Galway to the Maam Valley which runs from Maum or Maam to Leenaun or Leenane.

 station, on the Galway - Clifden line, opened on 1 January 1896.  It finally closed on 29 April 1935.  The station facilities and a short section of railway line have been restored in a project launched in 2017 and ongoing as of 2022.

The location has a service station and hotel, with dining facilities and a gift shop. It is also home to a weekly agricultural mart, handling sheep, cattle and Connemara ponies.

See also
 List of towns and villages in Ireland

References

External links
Maam Cross at Connemara Ireland

Gaeltacht places in County Galway